Jeanne d'Arc was a helicopter cruiser of the French Navy. She was the sixth vessel of the French Navy named after Joan of Arc ("Jeanne d'Arc" in French), a national heroine of France and saint of the Catholic Church who distinguished herself in the Hundred Years' War by helping France turn the tide of the Lancastrian phase.

In peacetime, Jeanne d'Arc was used for teaching and training purposes; however, in case of emergency or crisis, she was to have become a fully capable helicopter cruiser. Toward the end of her service life, Jeanne d'Arc became unsuitable for the role due to the increasing size and weight of helicopters.

She was renamed Jeanne d'Arc in 1964. The ship was retired in May 2010 and decommissioned in September 2010.

Career

Missions
In peacetime, Jeanne d'Arc was a teaching and training vessel for the naval officers' application academy, and at the same time possessed an aerial group of 2 Aérospatiale Puma and 2 Aérospatiale Gazelle French Army light aviation helicopters, as well as two Alouette III naval aviation helicopters.

Jeanne d'Arc was capable of combat deployment, either in an anti-submarine warfare role with 8 WG 13 Lynx helicopters, or for external missions by carrying Puma or Gazelle light aviation French Army helicopters. Initially, she was also able to carry landing troops and Sikorsky or Super Frelon helicopters.

Jeanne d'Arc could carry roughly 10 light or heavy helicopters and simultaneously handle the takeoff and landing of 3 helicopters.

Following the development of the Exocet anti-ship missile, Jeanne d'Arc was fitted with the system in 1974.

In 2008, Jeanne d'Arc was deployed in an anti-piracy role in the Gulf of Aden. The ship was used as part of the rescue effort of Le Ponant during the April 2008 hostage-taking incident. A Gazelle helicopter from Jeanne d'Arc carrying snipers chased and captured pirates who had escaped on 4x4 vehicles after the hostages had been freed.

Jeanne d'Arc commenced her final cruise in December 2009. The last trip included visits to Africa, South America including Rio and Buenos Aires, Lima, the French Antilles, the United States including New York City, and Canada. The deployment was completed in May 2010 with a return to the port of Brest, France on 27 May 2010. On its final mission, Jeanne d'Arc continued to perform its role as a training vessel for French navy midshipmen. On her final voyage, she was accompanied by the frigate  (F712), and carried a French training squadron with 103 cadets, including twelve from nine foreign countries.

End of service formalities
The Jeanne d'Arc helicopter cruiser was formally removed from active service in the French Marine Nationale on 7 June 2010. The necessary disarmament operations were formalised by decree of the Ministry of Defence on 4 June 2010 and announced in the Official Bulletin of the Marine Nationale, Edition No. 26, on 25 June 2010. The announcement stated that these disarmament procedures where to be conducted under the authority of the Admiral commanding the Naval Action Force (ALFAN), the Minister of Defence and the Deputy Chief of Staff, Support and Finance", Hubert Sciorella.

On 1 September 2010, at 11:30, Jeanne d'Arc's colours and name were withdrawn, formally ending her life as a ship in the Marine Nationale. This final colour ceremony on Jeanne d'Arc was held in the ship's home port of Brest. Following disarmament in the Arsenal basin there, the ship continued to be moored at the Brest naval base. On 9 September 2010, the former Jeanne d'Arc has its naval number R 97 removed and was moved to Piriouas as Hull Q 860 to undergo the work of securing the hulk and extracting the remaining recoverable hardware. The task of establishing an inventory of hazardous materials present on the vessel took place in the naval yards prior to dismantling the hull and was expected to take up to two years. A tender was then be sent for its dismantling. At the time, the French Navy had 76 hulks ready to be dismantled. The issue was a sensitive one, following problems arising from the disposal and dismantling of the former . In 2014, it was decided that Jeanne d'Arc would be dismantled at Bordeaux by the Bartin Recycling Group and Pétrofer, subsidiaries of Veolia Group. The contract was worth approximately 11.5 million Euros.

Gallery

See also
Ships of comparable role, configuration and era

References

Further reading
</ref>

External links 

 French Navy and Jeanne d'Arc site
 Official site
 Marine nationale, Porte-hélicoptères Jeanne d'Arc (R 97)-Présentation
  Marine nationale-ship description, Jeanne d'Arc (R97)
 Jeanne d'Arc moorned at Brest as of February 2012

Ships built in France
1961 ships
Helicopter carriers
Aircraft carriers of the French Navy
Amphibious warfare vessels of the French Navy
Cruisers of the French Navy
Cold War aircraft carriers of France
Cold War cruisers of France